Clathurellinae was a subfamily of small to quite large sea snails, marine gastropod mollusks in the family Conidae.

In 2011 this subfamily was split into three new families: Borsoniidae, Mitromorphidae and Clathurellidae

Genera 
Genera in the subfamily Clathurellinae used to include: The following list is maintained for historical reasons.
Abyssothauma
Anarithma Iredale, 1916
Aphanitoma Bellardi, 1875 (now in Borsoniidae)
Arielia Shasky, 1961
Asthenotoma Harris & Burrows, 1891 (now in Borsoniidae)
Austroturris Laseron, 1954 (now in Borsoniidae)
Bathytoma Harris & Burrows, 1891 (now in Borsoniidae)
Borsonella Dall, 1908 (now in Borsoniidae)
Borsonia A. Bellardi, 1839 (now in Borsoniidae)
Buridrillia Olsson, 1942
Clathurella Carpenter, 1857
Comarmondia Monterosato, 1884
Corinnaeturris Bouchet & Waren, 1980
Crockerella Hertlein & Strong, 1951
Cruziturricula
Cryptomella Finlay, 1924
Cytharopsis Adams, 1865
Darbya Bartsch, 1934 (now in Borsoniidae)
Diptychophila (now in Borsoniidae)
Drilliola Locard, 1897(now in Borsoniidae)
Etrema Hedley, 1918
Etremopa Oyama, 1953
Etremopsis Powell, 1942
Filodrillia Hedley, 1922 (now in Borsoniidae)
Genota H & A. Adams, 1853 (now in Borsoniidae)
Genotina Vera-Peláez, 2004
Glyphostoma Gabb, 1872
Heteroturris Powell, 1967 (now in Borsoniidae)
Lovellona Iredale, 1917
Maorimorpha Powell, 1939
Maoritomella Powell, 1942 (now in Borsoniidae)
Mitrellatoma Powell, 1942
Mitrithara Hedley, 1922
Mitromorpha Adams, 1865
Nannodiella Dall, 1918
Ophiodermella Bartsch, 1944 (now in Borsoniidae)
Paraborsonia Pilsbry, 1922 (now in Borsoniidae)
Phenatoma Finlay, 1924 (now in Borsoniidae)
Pulsarella Laseron, 1954 (now in Borsoniidae)
Retidrillia McLean, 2000 (now in Borsoniidae)
Scrinium Hedley, 1922
Strombinoturris
Suavodrillia Dall, 1918 (now in Borsoniidae)
Tomopleura Casey, 1904 (now in Borsoniidae)
Tropidoturris Kilburn, 1986 (now in Borsoniidae)
Typhlomangelia Sars G.O., 1878 (now in Borsoniidae)
Vexithara Finlay, 1926
Wairarapa Vella, 1954
Zetekia Dall, 1918

Notes:
Leiosyrinx Bouchet & Sysoev, 2001 and Typhlosyrinx Thiele, 1925 - These two genera were placed in the subfamily Raphitominae by Bouchet and Sysoev (2001), but in the World Register of Marine Species (2010) they are placed in Clathurellinae.

References

Further reading
Vaught, K.C. (1989). A classification of the living Mollusca. American Malacologists: Melbourne, FL (USA). . XII, 195 pp.

External links

 
Taxa named by Arthur Adams (zoologist)
Taxa named by Henry Adams (zoologist)